Five ships of the Hellenic Navy have borne the name Samos (Σάμος), named after the island of Samos:

  (1834–before 1853), a mistico bought by the newly established Royal Hellenic Navy from Samos in 1834
  (1881–1912), a Yarrow-built torpedo boat
 Greek destroyer Samos (1915), a  ordered in Britain, entered service with the British Royal Navy as HMS Melpomene
  (1943–1977), an LST1-class landing ship
  (1994–present), a 

Hellenic Navy ship names